The women's heptathlon event at the 1997 European Athletics U23 Championships was held in Turku, Finland, on 12 and 13 July 1997.

Medalists

Results

Final
12-13 July

Participation
According to an unofficial count, 15 athletes from 10 countries participated in the event.

 (2)
 (1)
 (1)
 (2)
 (2)
 (1)
 (1)
 (1)
 (2)
 (2)

References

Heptathlon
Combined events at the European Athletics U23 Championships